Danbury Township may refer to the following townships in the United States:

 Danbury Township, Stokes County, North Carolina
 Danbury Township, Ottawa County, Ohio